Obermutten is part of the municipality Mutten in the district of Albula in the canton of Graubünden in Switzerland.

Geography 

Obermutten is located in the Alvaschein sub-district of the Albula district. It is a three level settlement located to the south of the Shin Gorge (Schinschlucht). It affiliates to the village of Unter-Mutten (occupied all-year and at an elevation of 1,394 m, 4,573 ft), the middle village of Stafel (1,761 m, 5,778 ft) and the village Mutten.

Places of interest 
The 17th century wooden church in Obermutten is part of the Walser Trail in Graubünden.

Trivia 
In Autumn  2011, Obermutten has received worldwide media attention due to its unusual promise on the social-media platform Facebook. Everyone who liked the fan page has had her/his photo pinned onto the Commune’s official notice board.

References 
 Die Gemeinden des Kantons Graubünden. Chur/Zürich, 2003.

External links 
 Facebook, Obermutten
 Gemeinde Mutten
 NBC, Swiss Mountain Village Providing a Worldwide Sensation
 Gadling, Swiss village Obermutten has more Facebook fans than residents

Villages in Graubünden